The United Democratic Front (UDF) is the Indian National Congress-led alliance of centre to centre-right political parties in the Indian state of Kerala. It is one of the two major political alliances in Kerala, the other being Communist Party of India (Marxist)-led Left Democratic Front, each of which has been in power alternately since 1980 E. K. Nayanar ministry. Most of the United Democratic Front constituents are members of the Indian National Congress-led United Progressive Alliance at pan-India level.

United Democratic Front was created by the Indian National Congress (then known as Congress-Indira) party leader K. Karunakaran in 1979, as a successor to the existing Congress-led alliance. The alliance first came to power in 1981 (K. Karunakaran ministry) and has won elections to the state legislature of Kerala in the years 1982 (Karunakaran ministry), 1991 (Karunakaran and A. K. Antony ministries), 2001 (Antony and Oommen Chandy ministries), and 2011 (Oomen Chandy ministry). The alliance currently acts as the opposition in the state legislature of Kerala (after the 2021 legislative assembly election). United Democratic Front leaders V. D. Satheesan and K. Sudhakaran currently serves as the Leader of the Opposition and Kerala Pradesh Congress Committee President respectively.

The alliance currently consists of Indian National Congress, Indian Union Muslim League, Kerala Congress (Joseph), Kerala Congress (Jacob), Revolutionary Socialist Party and a variety of other smaller parties. The alliance follows big tent policy and includes a variety political parties.

Current members 

 Indian National Congress
 Indian Union Muslim League
 Kerala Congress
 Kerala Congress (Jacob)
 Democratic Congress Kerala 
 Revolutionary Socialist Party
 Revolutionary Marxist Party of India
 Communist Marxist Party
 All India Forward Bloc
 Bharatiya National Janata Dal
 Janathipathiya Samrakshana Samithy

Members of United democratic front

History

Antecedents 
Precursors to the United Democratic Front were,

 Joint Front (Pattom and Sankar ministries)
 Congress - Praja Socialist Party - Indian Union Muslim League (left 1961)
 Congress-supported "Mini Front" or "Democratic Front" (Menon ministry)
 Communist Party of India - Indian Union Muslim League - Kerala Congress - Indian Socialist Party
 Congress-supported "United Front"
 "Mini Front" or "Maxi Front" (Second Menon ministry)
 Congress (from 1971) - Communist Party of India Indian Union Muslim League - Revolutionary Socialist Party - Praja Socialist Party - Kerala Congress (from 1975) 
 "Ruling Front" or "Maxi Front Revamped" (Karunakaran, Antony and P. K. V. ministries)
 Congress - Communist Party of India - Kerala Congress - Indian Union Muslim League - Revolutionary Socialist Party
 Indian Union Muslim League - Praja Socialist Party - National Democratic Party alliance (supported by Congress) (Koya ministry)

United Democratic Front (1979 – present) 

The United Democratic Front (UDF) was formed just before 1980 assembly election. In elections, the Front was defeated by the Communist Party of India (Marxist)-led Left Democratic Front. However, the fall of the first Left Democratic Front ministry resulted in the 6th President's Rule in Kerala (1981).

United Democratic Front first came into power in Kerala in 1981 under K. Karunakaran. It led the Government of Kerala in 1982–87 (K. Karunakaran), 1991–96 (K. Karunakaran and A. K. Antony), 2001–06 (A. K. Antony and Oommen Chandy), and 2011–16 (Oommen Chandy). The alliance currently serves as the opposition in the Kerala Assembly.

 In the 2016 elections conducted to the Kerala state legislature, United Democratic Front managed to win 47 out of 140 seats to the assembly, and Congress leader Ramesh Chennithala was chosen as the Leader of Opposition. In 2019 Indian general election, the alliance won 19 out of 20 seats in the state. 
 In the last elections conducted to the Kerala state legislature in 2021, United Democratic Front managed to win 40 out of 140 seats to the assembly, and Congress leader V. D. Satheesan chosen as the Leader of Opposition. The alliance supported K. K. Rema for Vadakara Constituency who sits as a separate block.

Chief Ministers

Pre-United Democratic Front Congress Chief Ministers (1956 – 1979) 
 R. Sankar (1962 – 64)
 K. Karunakaran (1977)
 A. K. Antony (1977 – 78)

United Democratic Front Chief Ministers (1981 –  present)

List of United Democratic Front Chief Ministers by length of term

Leaders of Opposition (U. D. F) 

 K. Karunakaran (1980–81, 87 - 91)
 A. K. Antony (1996 - 2001)
 Oommen Chandy (2006–11)
 Ramesh Chennithala (2016–21)
 V. D. Satheesan (2021–present)

United Democratic Front Conveners

Legacy

K. Karunakaran 

The Mahatma Gandhi University, Kottayam, was established by bifurcating University of Kerala during the period of 3rd Karunakaran ministry (1982 - 87). It was during the second U. D. F. government (Third Karunakaran ministry), that the last two districts of Kerala, namely Pathanamthitta and Kasaragod, were inaugurated, raising the total number of districts in Kerala to fourteen. During his third tenure as Chief Minister (1982–87), Karunakaran directly handled the Scheduled Castes Development. Kerala State Film Development Corporation was also introduced during the tenure of Karunakaran.

Chief Minister Karunakaran was instrumental in several infrastructure projects in Kerala which includes the Jawaharlal Nehru Stadium in Kochi, and the Cochin International Airport, both of which were sanctioned during his 1991-95 stint as the Chief Minister. Vallarpadam Terminal, which later became the first transshipment terminal in India was other key project coined during the administration of Karunakaran. Other major infrastructure projects introduced during the terms of Karunakaran include the Goshree Bridges of Kochi, Guruvayur Railway Line, and Rajiv Gandhi Combined Cycle Power Plant at Kayamkulam. The first phase of Kollam Bypass was completed in 1993.

A. K. Antony 

Antony administration was instrumental in the establishment of Rajiv Gandhi Centre for Biotechnology at Thiruvananthapuram. The InfoPark at Kochi was established in the year 2004. It was also under his administration that the Kannur University was created by bifurcating the University of Calicut. The University of Sanskrit was inaugurated in 1994. The Indian Institute of Management and the National Institute of Technology at Kozhikode were established in the years 1996 and 2002 respectively. The "I. T. at School Project" and introduction of Information Technology as a subject in school level were initiated in 2001 by Third Antony ministry, making Kerala the first Indian state to do so. Antony also carried out Asian Development Bank aided "Modernization of Government Plan".

The Akshaya Project was implemented in 2002 to expand digital literacy in Kerala. During his tenure as Chief Minister, A. K. Antony introduced the Unemployment Allowance, Festival Allowance for the Kerala state employees.

During his tenure as Chief Minister, A. K. Antony introduced the prohibition of arrack in Kerala. It was at Chief Minister Antony's behest that the decision to construct the new Kerala Legislature Complex was taken in 1977. He also ordered the closure of the Kerala Coca-Cola plant in 2004 due to non-availability of drinking water in the plant area.

Oommen Chandy 
It was also during tenure of Oommen Chandy that 12 new taluks, 28 new municipalities, and Kannur Municipal Corporation were formed. It was the largest taluk delimitation in the state of Kerala after 1957.  The Kerala Urban Road Transport Corporation (KURTC) was formed under KSRTC in 2015 to manage affairs related to urban transportation. The Chandy ministry established new Government Medical Colleges in Kerala (in 2013, after a gap of 31 years). The "Karunya Scheme" was implemented in the year 2011–12 for the free treatment of patients with cancer, haemophilia, kidney, and heart diseases. A number of organ implantation surgeries were done through the "Mruthasanjeevani Project". The Second Chandy ministry had also taken the decision to prohibit liquor in Kerala by discouraging bars. The number of political killings were relatively low (11) during the period 2011–16 in the state.

Rubber subsidy to ensure a minimum price of Rs 150/kg was implemented in 2015.

In 2005, Information Technology was made a compulsory subject for the school-level students. Victers TV, the children's television channel on EDUSAT for schools, was inaugurated in 2005. The National University of Advanced Legal Studies at Kochi was founded in 2005 and the Indian Institute of Technology at Palakkad was established in the year 2015. The universities founded in 2011–16 period include the Malayalam University at Tirur (2012) and Technological University at Thiruvananthapuram (2014). The National Institute of Visual Science and Arts at Kottayam was inaugurated in January 2016. Kerala was declared as the first complete digital state of India on 27 February 2016.

The Kerala Public Service Commission filled the vacant posts during 2011–16. As many as  job candidates were appointed, setting a record. As many as 46,223 posts were created in the same period. The Phase-3 of the Technopark at Thiruvananthapuram was inaugurated in 2014. The Taurus Downtown at Technopark was commenced during the period 2011–16. The phase-2 of InfoPark, Kochi was inaugurated in May 2015. Phase-2 of InfoPark Thrissur was completed during the same period. The Park Centre of Cybercity at Kozhikode was formally opened by IT Minister P.K. Kunhalikutty on 15 February 2014. UL Cyberpark at Kozhikode was inaugurated in January 2016. Chandy's regime was instrumental in beginning the construction of the Smart City Project.

Chandy received the United Nation's Public Service Award for his Mass Contact Programme ("Jana Samparkka Paripadi"). The government also sanctioned of Unemployment Allowance. Social welfare pension amounts and numbers were doubled during the second Chandy ministry.  Old-age pension amounts were also increased. Other social welfare measures during Chandy reign include free ration for those who lost their employment. Free rice was given to those who did not belong to Above Poverty Line (APL). Food kits were distributed to the people during Onam, the Eid, and Christmas.

Chandy government constructed more than 400,000 houses for the homeless people in Kerala.

Chandy's regime was instrumental in beginning the construction of Kannur Airport, the Kochi Metro, and the Vizhinjam Port near Thiruvananthapuram. The Kochi-Mangalore GAIL pipeline was commissioned by the second Chandy ministry in 2013.  In 2015, the Cochin Airport became the world's first fully solar powered airport. During his period, 227 road bridges worth nearly Rs 16 billion were built across Kerala.

A number of state highways were constructed under Chandy government and the final decision to widen the national highways of the state to 45 m were taken in 2014. Several "bypass" roads were also constructed.

Kerala Assembly Election results

Electoral history

List of elected members

State legislature

The United Democratic Front currently has 41 members in the 140-member Kerala Legislative Assembly. The alliance currently forms the Opposition in the Assembly.

Key

Lok Sabha 

Out of the 20 Lok Sabha (House of the People) constituencies in Kerala, 19 were won by the United Democratic Front in 2019 Lok Sabha election (including Thomas Chazhikadan, Kerala Congress Mani from Kottayam). Later when the Kerala Congress Mani crossed floors to join Left Democratic Front (2020), the number of M. P.s reduced to 18.

The following is the list of United Democratic Front Lok Sabha members from the state of Kerala:

Key

Rajya Sabha 
The following is the list of United Democratic Front Rajya Sabha members from the state of Kerala:

Key

See also 
 United Front (1970–79)
 Kerala Pradesh Congress Committee
 Indian National Congress
 United Progressive Alliance
 Left Democratic Front

References

Further reading
 

Political parties in Kerala
Political party alliances in India
Social democratic parties in Asia
United Progressive Alliance
Political parties established in 1979
1979 establishments in Kerala